Alfred Earle "Greasy" Neale (November 5, 1891 – November 2, 1973) was an American football and baseball player and coach.

Early life and playing career
Neale was born in Parkersburg, West Virginia. Although writers eventually assumed that Neale got his nickname, "Greasy", from his elusiveness on the football field, it actually arose during his youth, from a name-calling joust with a friend.

Baseball career
He played Major League Baseball as an outfielder with the Cincinnati Reds between 1916 and 1924 and briefly with the Philadelphia Phillies for part of the 1921 season. Neale was the starting right fielder for the championship-winning 1919 Reds. He batted .357 in the 1919 World Series and led the Reds with ten hits in their eight-game series win over the scandalous White Sox.

Neale spent all but 22 games of his baseball career with the Reds. He had a career batting average of .259 with 8 home runs, 200 RBI, and 139 stolen bases, and finished in the top ten in stolen bases in the National League four times. When football season came around, often he would leave baseball and fulfill his football duties (albeit playing about 90% of a baseball season most years, with the exception of 1919 when he played the entire season, including the World Series).

Football career
Neale also played professional football in the Ohio League with the Canton Bulldogs in 1917, the Dayton Triangles in 1918, and the Massillon Tigers in 1919. He starred as an end on Jim Thorpe's pre-World War I Canton Bulldogs as well as the Dayton Triangles in 1918 and Massillon Tigers in 1919. He coached the Triangles in 1918.

Coaching in college
Neale began his coaching career while still a professional player. He served as the head football coach at Muskingum College (1915), West Virginia Wesleyan College (1916–1917), Marietta College (1919–1920), Washington & Jefferson College (1921–1922), the University of Virginia (1923–1928), and West Virginia University (1931–1933), compiling a career college football record of 82–54–11. He coached basketball for two seasons at Marietta (1919–1921) as well, amassing a record of 26–11. He also served as an assistant football coach at Yale Bulldogs football for seven seasons (1934–1940).

At Washington & Jefferson, he led his 1921 squad to the Rose Bowl, where the Presidents played the California Golden Bears to a scoreless tie.  At Virginia, Neale was also the head baseball coach from 1923 to 1929, tallying a mark of 80–73–2.

Independent football
Neale later coached the independent professional Ironton Tanks. He and Tanks quarterback Glenn Presnell claimed victories against the NFL's second-place New York Giants and third-place Chicago Bears in 1930. The team folded in 1931.

Coaching in the pros
Neale moved to the National Football League (NFL), serving as head coach of the Philadelphia Eagles from 1941 to 1950. From 1944 through 1949, Neale's Eagles finished second three times and in first place three times. The Eagles won the NFL Championship in 1948 and again in 1949, and became the first team to win back-to-back titles since the 1940-41 Chicago Bears by shutting out their opponents, beating the Chicago Cardinals 7–0 in the snow-ridden 1948 NFL Championship Game and the Los Angeles Rams 14–0 in the 1949 NFL Championship Game in a driving rain storm. It was the last championship for the Eagles until 1960.  His offense was led by the passing of quarterback Tommy Thompson, the pass catching of future Hall of Fame end Pete Pihos, and the running of another Hall of Famer, Steve Van Buren. He tallied a mark of 66–44–5 including playoff games in his ten seasons with the club. Neale was inducted into the College Football Hall of Fame in 1967 and the Pro Football Hall of Fame in 1969. Both inductions recognized his coaching career.

Neale died in Florida at the age of 81 and is buried at Parkersburg Memorial Gardens in West Virginia.

Head coaching record

College football

NFL

See also
 List of St. Louis Cardinals coaches

Notes

References

Further reading

External links
 
 
 
 
 

1891 births
1973 deaths
American football ends
Baseball players from West Virginia
Basketball coaches from West Virginia
Canton Bulldogs (Ohio League) players
Cincinnati Reds players
Clarksburg Generals players
Cleveland Bearcats players
Coaches of American football from West Virginia
College Football Hall of Fame inductees
Dayton Triangles (Ohio League) players
Ironton Tanks players
London Tecumsehs (baseball) players
Major League Baseball outfielders
Marietta Pioneers football coaches
Marietta Pioneers men's basketball coaches
Massillon Tigers players
Minor league baseball managers
Muskingum Fighting Muskies football coaches
Parkersburg High School alumni
Sportspeople from Parkersburg, West Virginia
Philadelphia Eagles head coaches
Philadelphia Phillies players
Players of American football from West Virginia
Pro Football Hall of Fame inductees
Saginaw Ducks players
St. Louis Cardinals coaches
Steagles players and personnel
Virginia Cavaliers baseball coaches
Virginia Cavaliers football coaches
Washington & Jefferson Presidents football coaches
West Virginia Mountaineers football coaches
West Virginia Wesleyan Bobcats baseball players
West Virginia Wesleyan Bobcats basketball players
West Virginia Wesleyan Bobcats football coaches
West Virginia Wesleyan Bobcats football players
Wheeling Stogies players
Yale Bulldogs football coaches